"Baby Get Away" is a pop song written by David Most, Michael Burns and Steve Glen and recorded by Australian pop singer Christie Allen. The song was released in August 1980 as the lead single from Allen's second studio album, Detour (1980). The song peaked at number 38 on the Kent Music Report in Australia.

Track listing 
7" (K 8016) 
Side A – "Baby Get Away" - 3:44
Side B – "Don't Stop"  - 2:57

Charts

References 

1980 songs
1980 singles
Christie Allen songs
Mushroom Records singles